Revue des Monats (German: Revue of the Month) was a German language monthly general interest magazine which existed between 1926 and 1933 during the Weimar period in Berlin, Germany.

History and profile
Revue des Monats was first published in November 1926. The magazine was founded by Hubert Miketta and published by Die Revue des Monats GmbH on a monthly basis in Berlin. Miketta was also the editor-in-chief of the magazine which covered articles concerning different topics, including film industry and short stories. The other topics included in Revue des Monats were theatre, fashion, sport, technology, automotive industry and visual arts. Its target audience was both women and men. The magazine folded in 1933 shortly after the beginning of the fascist rule in Germany.

References

1926 establishments in Germany
1933 disestablishments in Germany
Defunct magazines published in Germany
German-language magazines
Magazines established in 1926
Magazines disestablished in 1933
Magazines published in Berlin
Monthly magazines published in Germany
News magazines published in Germany